OptiPlex (a portmanteau of "optimal" and "-plex") is a line of business-oriented desktop and all-in-one computers aimed at corporate enterprises, healthcare, government, and education markets released in 1993 by Dell. Business-oriented components, such as Gigabit Ethernet, DisplayPort, Tool-less Chassis and software such as data protection utilities, along with management features such as Intel vPro often come standard with OptiPlex systems. OptiPlex configurations can be completed by the purchaser for components such as CPU, GPU, RAM, Storage and Wireless options, as well as Dell Pro support.

History 
In 1993, Dell released the OptiPlex and NetPlex lines in the wake of its first quarterly loss. Its disappointing results were partially attributed to poor returns on its notebook division; however, Dell's desktop and server lines continued to see success, particularly within the enterprise market.

The new offerings were positioned accordingly. The NetPlex line consisted of inexpensive i486 workstations designed to be used as corporate network clients. The OptiPlex line offered the same networking capabilities as the NetPlex along with additional features such as VESA Local Bus expansion slots, expandable VRAM, and stronger processor models. It also targeted large enterprises with features such as embedded diagnostics.

Overview

Series 1 - Classic beige

In the classic beige chassis:

Series 2 

In the midnight-gray chassis:

Series 3 - BTX
Dell OptiPlex from 2005 to 2009 followed Intel's BTX standard. The first model to sport the new BTX layout was the OptiPlex 170L and also the OptiPlex GX280 had a BTX variant albeit uncommon. The last model to be BTX is the OptiPlex 980. 7xx Series DT models can be configured with a riser card to accommodate two full height cards. The riser card fits over the top PCIe x16 slot and middle PCI which is slightly longer with extra pins, this is however not PCI-X. Features DirectDetect system health status indicators for troubleshooting and diagnostics.

Capacitor issues 
OptiPlex models (mostly produced in 2003 and 2004), notably the GX270, suffered from frequent failures due to faulty capacitors supplied by Nichicon as part of the capacitor plague. These capacitors would bulge and leak, resulting in product failure after only a few years of use. Leaked internal documents allege that Dell knew that the computers were likely to fail, and continued to ship them.

Series 4 
The OptiPlex 960 introduced a new style of cases, made with recyclable plastics. The first two models, namely the 960 and 980 were based on BTX, However the rest of this series was built upon the standard ATX and DTX. From the x020 and onwards, Dell switched over from a standard 24 pin power connector to a proprietary 12v only 8 pin connector for better power efficiency. The DT and SSF models from this series used standard TFX and LFX power supplies, respectively (the LFX power supplies do have a nonstandard depth of 240mm, however), while the MT models used standard ATX power supplies.

Series 5 
Dell OptiPlex computers sold from 2015 to 2020 use cases that resembled the style used in Dell laptops of the same era. These OptiPlex machines are no longer standard ATX or MicroATX.

Windows 11 support 
Windows 11 requires TPM 2.0 and an 8th generation Intel or newer processor. Some models in Series 5 between 2015 and 2019 shipped with TPM 1.2, but are capable of meeting these requirements with a firmware upgrade to TPM 2.0 and the appropriate minimum CPU.

Potential models that may be able to support Windows 11 include: Intel H370 chipset (3060 / 3070), Intel Q370 chipset (5060 / 5070, 5260 / 5270, 7060 / 7070 / 7070 Ultra, 7460 / 7470, 7760 / 7770).

Series 6 - Pro 2 
The Dell OptiPlex chassis now follows the Pro 2 chassis introduced with the OptiPlex 7071 and now also on the 3080, 5080 and 7080 models. Up to a 500W 92% 80+ Platinum PSU and support for Nvidia RTX Graphics Cards. All Models including All-in-ones offer 802.11ax WiFi 6 Options and all Desktop models offer a Serial Port Adapter, which can be expanded with a variety of ports including; Serial Ports, VGA, DisplayPorts, HDMI, and USB Type C alt DisplayPorts. OptiPlex offers Energy Star 8.0 configurations, as well as EPEAT Silver and Gold configurations to its customers.

Models, in relative chronological order

Series 1

Series 2 (Midnight grey)

Series 3 (BTX)

Series 4

Series 5

Series 6

OptiPlex XE 
The Dell OptiPlex XE is a special version designed for equipment manufacturer, retail/point-of-sale (POS) systems. They are based on the standard OptiPlex models with added features; such as a higher heat threshold, MIL-STD 810G testing and powered USB/Serial.

Notes

See also 
HP business desktops
 Dell Latitude and Precision
Lenovo ThinkCentre and ThinkStation desktops
Fujitsu Esprimo

References

External links 

 Dell PCs Buying Guide Dell's official PC buying guides site.
 Dell USA: OptiPlex desktop machines intended for medium and large businesses
 Dell Support for more information about specifications.

OptiPlex
Computer-related introductions in 1993
Business desktop computers